Bhaona is a traditional form of entertainment, with religious messages, prevalent is Assam, India. It is a creation of Mahapurusha Srimanta Sankardeva, written in the early sixteenth century. He created the form to convey religious messages to villagers through entertainment. Later Srimanta Madhavdeva also wrote some plays. The plays of bhaona are popularly known as Ankiya Nats and their staging is known as bhaona. Bhaona is generally staged at xatras and namghars in Assam. There are some special characteristics of Bhaona like the plays, dialogues, costumes, ornaments, entry and foot-steps of the characters. These characteristics helps to differentiate Bhaona from other plays.

The bhaonas are written in the Assamese and Brajavali languages.

In order to witness the Bhaona culture and traditions, one ought to visit Majuli, the largest river island in the world. Majuli receives a huge footfall of foreign tourists from all over the world every year. The natives of this island are very cordial and hospitable and overwhelm everybody with their simplicity. The different xatras perform and maintain the teachings of Srimanta Sankardev to this date keeping alive dying customs and preserving their heritage.

Different characters

 Sutradhar or Sutradhari: He is an integral part of bhaona; he recites slokas, sings, dances and explains in prose what is what at every stage of Bhaona.
 Bhaoriya : The actors performing characters as per script.
 Gayan : The singers.
 Bayan : They plays khol, Taal etc. from the beginning to the end of bhaona.

Types of Bhaona
 Baresahariya Bhaona
 Mukha Bhaona
 Boka Bhaona

References

External links

 
 About Bhaona at bordowathan.com.
 ‘Boka Bhaona’ at Kangkhapar Majthai Satra at The Assam Tribune.

Ekasarana Dharma
Culture of Assam
Theatre in India